The river Thielle, is a tributary to the Aare, in the Swiss Seeland.

The Thielle results from the merging of the Orbe and Talent, northeast of the little city of Orbe in the Swiss canton of Vaud. It flows as a channel northeastwards through an intensively cultivated plain called "Plaine de l'Orbe" and flows after only 9 km into the Lake of Neuchâtel at Yverdon-les-Bains.

The natural course of the river was considerably modified during the Jura water correction. Between the Lakes of Neuchâtel and Biel/Bienne it was converted into a dug-out channel. However, the previous natural bed of La Thielle still exists in some parts.

The river flows out of the lake in Biel/Bienne and after 2 km merges directly into the Nidau-Büren channel, which was also dug out during the Jura water correction, ensuring the outflow of the Aare, just before the regulating dam in Port which was commissioned in 1939. Before, La Thielle used to flow into the Aare 7 km further downstream in the vicinity of Büren an der Aare.

In the seventeenth century, a grand project was formed to establish a waterway transport system connecting the rivers Rhône and Rhine via the Lake of Geneva - the Venoge - and the Canal d’Entreroches - La Thielle - Aare. It unfortunately remained unfinished.

A commercial waterway of this nature would have had a very significant impact on the European commercial transportation system.

References
 Vielle Thielle
 Canal de la Thielle

Rivers of Switzerland
Tributaries of Lake Neuchâtel
Bern–Neuchâtel border
Rivers of the canton of Bern
Rivers of the canton of Vaud
Rivers of the canton of Neuchâtel